Mohammed Kazem (born 1969) is a contemporary Emirati artist working in Dubai, United Arab Emirates. He works primarily with video, sound art, photography, found objects and performance art.

Kazem is one of the five conceptual Emirati artists whose work was recognized as a group in the 2002 exhibition “5 UAE” at the Ludwig Museum, Aachen. The other artists in the group include the late Hassan Sharif, Hussain Sharif (brother of Hassan Sharif), Abdullah Al Saadi and Mohammed Ahmed Ibrahim.

Early life and education 
Kazem was born in 1969 and was the son of a taxicab driver.

At age 14, Kazem decided to drop out from school and join the army. He found art as a mean to escape his reality and express himself as a teenager, he started to investigate his surrounding environment as a keen artist to explore new methods of art.

Career 
In 1984, he was formally introduced to his future mentor and friend, Hassan Sharif, founder of Dubai Art Atelier; the first dedicated centre for young artists, and a pioneer of conceptual art scene in the early 70s in the United Arab Emirates.

In 1987, Kazem obtained a degree in painting from Emirates Fine Arts Society, and later joined the University of the Arts in Philadelphia where he got his Masters in Fine Arts in 2012.

Kazem is best recognized for his conceptual work Directions (2005-2013) and Autobiography (1997–present).

Selected exhibitions 
 1997 Autobiography 1, UAE
 2000 Havana Biennial  – Havana, Cuba 
 2002 the Dhaka Biennial (2002), Dhaka, Bangladesh
 2003 Art Cologne, n 37, cologne, Germany
 2003 Sharjah Biennial 6, Sharjah, UAE
 2006 Singapore Biennial, Singapore.
 2013 Poetics and Meanings, Dubai, UAE
 2013 UAE Pavilion, Venice Biennial, Italy
 2013 Emirati Expressions, Saadiyat Island, Abu Dhabi, UAE
 2015 Sharjah Biennial 12, Sharjah, UAE
 2017 Abu Dhabi Rolls-Royce Art Programme

Collections 
Kazem's work is housed in private and public collections  including:
 Mathaf: Arab Museum of Modern Art in Doha, Qatar.
 the Sharjah Art Museum, Sharjah, UAE.
 Barjeel Art Foundation, Sharjah, UAE.
 Sittard Art Center, Netherlands.
 JP Morgan Chase Collection, USA.
 Deutsche Bank Collection, Germany.

See also 

Hassan Sharif
Emirates Fine Arts Society
Sharjah Biennial
:Category:Emirati contemporary artists

References 

1969 births
Living people
Emirati contemporary artists
Emirati male artists
Emirati conceptual artists